Jil Teichmann was the defending champion, but chose to participate in Lexington instead.

Simona Halep won the title, defeating Elise Mertens in the final, 6–2, 7–5.

Seeds

Draw

Finals

Top half

Bottom half

Qualifying

Seeds

Qualifiers

Lucky losers

Draw

First qualifier

Second qualifier

Third qualifier

Fourth qualifier

References

External Links
 Main Draw
 Qualifying Draw

Singles